The white-throated tyrannulet (Mecocerculus leucophrys) is a species of bird in the family Tyrannidae.

It is found in Argentina, Bolivia, Brazil, Colombia, Ecuador, Peru, and Venezuela. Its natural habitat is subtropical or tropical moist montane forests.

References

white-throated tyrannulet
Birds of the Northern Andes
Birds of Venezuela
white-throated tyrannulet
Taxonomy articles created by Polbot